Mariam-uz-Zamani; ( – 19 May 1623), commonly known by the misnomer  'Jodha Bai', was the chief consort and principal Rajput empress consort as well as the favourite wife of the third Mughal emperor, Akbar. She was also the longest-serving Hindu empress of the Mughal Empire with a tenure of forty-three years (1562 –1605).

Born a Rajput princess, she was married to Akbar by her father, Raja Bharmal of Amer due to political exigencies. Her marriage to Akbar led to a gradual shift in the latter's religious and social policies. She is widely regarded in modern Indian historiography as exemplifying both Akbar's and the Mughals' tolerance of religious differences and their inclusive policies within an expanding multi-ethnic and multi-religious empire.  She was an extremely beautiful woman and was said to possess uncommon beauty. She was presumed to have possessed a strong, sinewy frame and was widely known for both her grace and intellect. In the words of Akbar, she's described as 'a piece of the moon'.

She was a senior-ranking wife of Akbar who in the words of Abu'l-Fazl ibn Mubarak, commanded a high rank in the imperial harem. She is stated as the favourite and an influential consort of Akbar, having a considerable influence in the matters of the court. Described as an intelligent, amiable, kind and liberal woman, 
she was often consulted by Akbar on important matters. She was the mother of Akbar's eldest surviving son and eventual successor, Jahangir, and grandmother of Shah Jahan.

Name, Titles and Background

Mariam-uz-Zamani was born in 1542 as the daughter of Raja Bharmal of Amer by his wife Rani Champavati, daughter of Rao Ganga Solanki. Her paternal grandparents were Raja Prithviraj Singh I and Apurva Devi, a daughter of Rao Lunkaran of Bikaner.

Her birth name is unknown. Later historical accounts give several suggestions for her birth name. In an 18th-century genealogy of her clan (the Kachwahas) for example, she is referred to as ' Harkhan Champavati '. Other names provided by various sources include Harkha Bai, Jiya Rani, Maanmati bai, Harika bai, Hira Kunwari, Heer Kunwari, Shahi-Bai and Shahi Begum.

She was bestowed an honorific Muslim name, 'Wali Nimat Begum' ( 'Blessings of God') by Akbar, in 1564, after two years of her marriage. 'Mariam-uz-Zamani' ( 'Mary/Compassionate of the Age') was a prestigious title bestowed on her by Akbar on the occasion of their son Jahangir's birth. This was the title by which she was referred to in contemporary Mughal chronicles, including Jahangir's autobiography, the Tuzk-e-Jahangiri. Apart from the title of Mariam-uz-Zamani, she also bore two more glorious titles of 'Mallika-e-Muezamma' ( 'Exalted Empress') and 'Mallika-e-Hindustan' ( 'Empress of Hindustan'). She was commonly referred as 'Shahi Begum' ( 'Imperial consort') throughout her reign. She would officially use the name Wali Nimat Mariam-uz-Zamani Begum Sahiba.

Erroneous Identification

The misnomer of Jodha Bai
Akbar ordained that the names of women of his seraglio should not be mentioned in public as the sanctity of Mughal women was considered so great that even their names could not be pronounced, they should be designated by some epithet either from the place of their birth or the country or the city in which they have been first regarded by the monarch with the eye of affection, hence Mariam Zamani had been addressed as the daughter of Raja Bharmal or sister of Raja Bhagwant Das in Akbarnama. Her son, Salim referred to her by her title, Hazrat Mariam-uz-Zamani in his chronicles. This led to the confusion and freedom exercised by various historians to guess and speculate her birth name. 

The name by which she is most popularly known in modern times is 'Jodha Bai'. The name 'Jodha Bai' was first used in relation to Mariam-uz-Zamani in James Tod's Annals and Antiquities of Rajasthan, a colonialist history written in the early 19th century. This naming appears to have been an error, given that it implies a relationship with the royal family of Jodhpur, rather than that with the Rajas of Amber. Instead, it is assumed that 'Jodha Bai' or 'Jodh Bai' in fact refers to the wife of Jahangir, Jagat Gosain, the daughter of Raja Udai Singh of Jodhpur.

Misidentification as Christian
Mariam-uz-Zamani's identity has been throughout centuries falsely inferred as Christian primarily on the pretext of her title, 'Mariam', and the absence of her background details from official Mughal chronicles giving rise to speculation about her race and religion. It was presumed by various writers that since she was named Mariam, she must have been a Christian lady. However Islam revers Mary or Mariam as their own. Maryam is the only woman named in their holy book Quran and as per Muslims, she was the greatest woman to ever lived. This signifies the honour bestowed upon the empress and her distinguished rank as Akbar's wife as a title with an identical name, 'Mariam Makani' was bestowed over Akbar's mother by Akbar. 

According to Edmund Smith, the story of Salim's mother being of Christian origin was started by some visitors of Fatehpur Sikri who expressed the idea that the painting in Mariam's house at Fatehpur Sikri represented annunciation and therefore believed that Mariam must have been a Christian, however, the liberal historian of Akbar, Abul Fazl makes no mention of her being Christian or Akbar ever having a Christian wife. Additionally Khulasat-ut-Tawarikh, a chronicle written in the Mughal era, explicitly states Mariam-uz-Zamani as a daughter of Raja Bharmal, therefore putting end to the supposition of her being a Christian. It was not only that the painting in Sonahra Makan may have led to speculation of her as Christian but the name Maryam (Mary) has also led weight to the theory of "Christian wife" however Maryam is a common name among Muslims and Maryam-uz-Zamani (Mary of Age) was conferred upon her on the birth of her son, prince Salim. For the verification of the assertion of her association with Christianity, Edmund Smith had her crypt opened to find out whether the tomb was that of a Christian lady, but he did not find any trace of the cross.

Marriage, Religion and birth of children

Marriage
Mariam-uz-Zamani's marriage was the result of a conflict between her father and Akbar's brother-in-law, Sharif-ud-din Mirza, the Hakim of Mewat. Raja Bharmal had been facing harassment at Sharif-ud-din's hands, on account of his conflict with Sujamal. Bharmal agreed to pay peshkash and had given his son and Mariam-uz-Zamani's full brother, Jagannath, and two nephews, Raj Singh, son of Raja Askaran and Khangar, son of Jagmal, as hostages but Sharif-ud-din wished to destroy him. So he approached Akbar to request his intervention. The Emperor agreed to mediate on the condition of Raja Bharmal's submission, as well as the suggestion that his daughter be given to Akbar in marriage. Raja Bharmal then espoused his gentle daughter, who was veiled in chastity, in honourable wedlock to Emperor Akbar, and was enlisted in the rank of honoured consorts. Akbarnama quotes, "Raja Bharmal introduced his eldest daughter, in whose forehead shone the lights of chastity and intellect, among the attendants on the glorious pavilion."

The marriage, thus,  a political one, took place amidst proper festivity on February 6, 1562, while Akbar was on his way back to Agra from Ajmer (after offering prayers at the tomb of Moinuddin Chishti) at the imperial military camp in Sambhar, Rajasthan, instead of the bride's natal home. As per Abu'l Fazl, Akbar accepted the marriage proposal of the daughter of Raja Bharmal due to a divine vision he had at Ajmer Sharif. The Amber princess's marriage provided her family's powerful support throughout the reign.

Views of eminent historians about their marriage:

Religion and Style
Akbar, at the insistence of Raja Bharmal, did not convert the princess to Islam and permitted her to perform Hindu rituals in her palace.  Although the marriage was a result of a political alliance, the two however gradually developed an intimate and affectionate bond. Akbar himself is recorded to participate in the Pooja performed by the beautiful empress though he married several other Hindu princesses in his life. She gradually became his most loved wife and till his death remained his favourite and subsequently was also the only wife buried close to Akbar. She was a devotee of Lord Krishna. The palace commissioned for her by Akbar in the imperial harem was decorated with paintings of Lord Krishna, and, gems and frescoes.

Harka bai arrived at Akbar's court resplendent in the sensuous and excessively feminine style of the Rajput nobility. She is illustrated to wear heavy, swinging, and gathered ghagra which would stop well above her ankle and a tightly fitting choli, tied at back with tasselled strings. Her head and shoulders were covered with an odhani but so translucent and fine that her bare midriff and arms were visible through that shimmering dupatta. Light would flicker against her heavy gold jewellery -swinging earrings, nose rings, clinging bracelets, and girdle of gold. 
In a few years, the culture and dressing style of this Rajput princess influenced the Mughal dresses and etiquette of the Mughal court. Cohen suggests that by including the textiles like bandhani in the royal paintings made in the region near the birthplace of Maryam Zamani, Akbar and Jahangir might be acknowledging her importance. Her roots were deeply embedded in the Rajput culture and style which was exhibited in her colourful and elaborated odhani or embroidered lehengas.

Birth of Twins
On 19 October 1564, after two years of her marriage, Mariam-uz-Zamani gave birth to twin sons, Mirza Hassan and Mirza Hussain. Akbar arrived in Agra on 9 October 1564 for the birth of twins. Both of them died within a few days of their birth. Mirza Hussain died on 29 October 1564 and Mirza Hassan died on 5 November 1564.

Grief struck, Akbar took Mariam-uz-Zamani along with him after their sons' demise as he set out for a war campaign, and during his return to Agra, he sought the blessings of Salim Chisti, a reputed Khawja who lived at Fatehpur Sikri. Akbar confided in Salim Chisti who assured him that he would be soon delivered of three sons who would live up to a ripe old age.

A few years before the birth of prince Salim, Akbar and Mariam-uz-Zamani went barefoot on a pilgrimage to Ajmer Sharif Dargah to pray for a son.

Birth of Prince Salim
In 1569, Akbar heard the news that his chief consort was expecting a child again and hoped for the first of the three sons that had been promised to him after the death of the twins by Khawaja Salim Chisti. The expectant empress was sent to the Salim Chisti humble dwelling in Fatehpur Sikri during the latter period of her pregnancy. Akbar himself travelled often from Agra to Fatehpur Sikri during her period of pregnancy to take care of the empress for whom a royal palace named Rang Mahal was constructed in Fatehpur Sikri.

One day while Mariam-uz-Zamani was pregnant with Salim, the baby stopped kicking in the womb abruptly. Akbar was at that time hunting cheetahs when this matter was reported to him, thinking if he could have done anything more, as that day was Friday he vowed that from that day he would never hunt cheetahs on Friday for the safety of his unborn child and as per Salim he kept his vow till throughout his life. Salim too in reverence for his father's vow never hunted cheetahs on Friday.

On 31 August 1569, the empress gave birth to a boy who received the name, Salim, in acknowledgement of his father's faith in the efficacy of the holy man's prayer. Akbar, overjoyed with the news of his heir-apparent, ordered a great feast and festivities which were held up to seven days on the occasion of his birth and ordered the release of criminals with great offence. Throughout the empire, largesses were bestowed over common people, and he set himself ready to visit Sikri immediately. However, he was advised by his courtiers to delay his visit to Sikri on the account of the astrological belief in Hindustan of a father not seeing the face of his long-awaited son immediately after his birth. He, therefore, delayed his visit and visited Sikri to meet his wife and son after forty-one days after his birth.

Akbar's ecstasy in having his heir-apparent born to Heer Kunwari was enormous and publicly proclaimed, "It is right for that piece of moon". The Empress was presented with jewellery worth one lakh gold coins immediately when Akbar met her for that first time in Sikri after the birth of sultan Salim and gave a 'Rajvanshi pat' on her head expressing his love. She was subsequently given the high honour of being titled 'Mariam-uz-Zamani' (Mary/Compassionate of the Age). The ranks of Raja Bhagwan Das and Man Singh I were raised by two thousand horses each, and they were presented with robes of honour graded next only to those bestowed upon members of the royal family. Akbar broke his own records of generosity by giving rich awards and extensive Jagirs to the elite of the court.

She was purported to be the foster mother of Daniyal Mirza, as initially his care and protection were entrusted to her maternal clan. Several marriages of her eldest son Salim and her foster son, Daniyal, were held at her palace.

Family advancement
Mariam-uz-Zamani's family became one of the highest-ranking nobles in the Akbar's court. The Rajas of Amber especially benefited from their close association with the Mughals and acquired immense wealth and power. Her family was held in high esteem by Akbar for their unmatchable courage, devotion, and loyalty all of which greatly endeared to the Emperor. Of twenty-seven Rajputs in Abu'l-Fazl list of mansabdars, thirteen were of the Amber clan, and some of them rose to positions as high as that of imperial princes.

Her father Raja Bharmal, after her marriage to Akbar, was immediately made the commander of 5000 cavalry units, the highest rank that could be held by the noble in the court. Mariam-uz-Zamani's brother Bhagwant Das in the year 1585, became commander of 5000 cavalry units and bore the proud title Amir-ul-Umra (Chief Noble). His son, Man Singh I, rose even higher to become commander of 7000 forces, the first to hold that rank in Akbar's reign, and it was only later that Akbar's foster brother Mirza Aziz Koka was raised to the same rank. Akbar referred to Raja Man Singh farzand (son). Even Raja Bihari Mal was denied that eminent rank, he did not cross the five thousand mark. However, it may be of interest that of the four hundred and sixteen Mansabdars of Akbar, only forty-seven were Rajputs, and the aggregate of their quotas amounted to fifty-three thousand horses. Of these, seventeen held Mansabs of from two thousand to five thousand and thirty from one hundred to two thousand. The princes of Amber, Marwar, Bikaner, Bundi, Jaisalmer and Bundelkhand held Mansabs of above one thousand, but Amber alone held the dignity of five thousand. His equation with the Amber Raja and his nephew Man Singh was conditioned in no small measure by his tenderness, tantamounting almost to love, for Mariam Zamani.

Akbar's respect for the family of Mariam-uz-Zamani was profound. As per historian Badani, who specializes in Rajputana history, Akbar shared an intimate relationship with the Amer clan. After the death of the fiancé of one of the daughters of Raja Bharmal and younger sister of Mariam-uz-Zamani, Sukanya, in the Battle of Paronkh in October 1562, Akbar personally took the responsibility for her marriage to a Rajput clan and adopted her as her own daughter. To honour them, he visited her native town, Amer, in the year 1569 and enjoyed the largesse bestowed over him by his in-laws. During this time, Mariam-uz-Zamani was into the fourth month of her pregnancy and thereafter was shortly delivered with Salim. Abul Fazl notes that his stay in Amer was of a month and a half and Akbar was showered with several noticeable gifts.

Mariam-uz-Zamani also arranged the marriage of the daughter of her brother, Raja Bhagwant Das, to Salim on 13 February 1585. Man bai became the first and chief consort of Prince Salim. For this marriage Akbar personally visited the town of Amer and as a token of respect for her family carried the palanquin of her daughter-in-law on his shoulders for some distance. Man Bai later became the mother to Akbar's favourite grandson, Khusrau Mirza, and received the prestigious title of 'Shah Begum'.

The Empress of Hindustan
The Empress held a significant influence over Akbar. Her high rank in the imperial harem provided her with substantial power and privilege, and she was designated as in charge of the Hindu harem of Akbar. Tirmizi proclaims it was her retirement as the Empress Consort of the Mughal Empire after the demise of her husband, Akbar that led to the decline of Rajput influence in the Mughal court. She is described as a charismatic and adventurous woman having a high-spirited disposition and a taste for the unusual.

She has high praises reserved in the biography of her husband. As stated by Abu'l-Fazl ibn Mubarak in Akbarnama, she's described as both intellectual and tactful and is termed as an auspicious lady having lights of chastity and intellect shining on her forehead. Abul Fazl calls her “the choicest apple from the garden of paradise". Badayuni in his book states Akbar's affection and endearment for her with the statement "magic the kind daughter of Raja Bharmal did on Akbar". Another contemporary account describes her as a 'great adventurer'.

She was a major driving force and prime inspiration for Akbar's promotion of secularism. In the words of historian Lal, "The personality and beauty of Mariam-uz-Zamani were indeed partly responsible for Akbar's religious neutrality." Nizamuddin Ahmad professes  'daughter of Raja Bihari Mal, who was veiled in chastity, was ennobled by a marriage with His Majesty and was enlisted in the rank of honoured consorts.'  Abdul Qadir Badayuni describes her as a woman with a gentle disposition.

She had her garden in Agra which was gifted to her by Akbar and had several palaces constructed for her by Akbar in Fatehpur Sikri, Mandu, Lahore, and Allahabad. In Agra, her palace of residence is believed to be Jahangiri Mahal, constructed by Akbar for his Hindu wives. When Akbar moved his court to Fatehpur Sikri in 1571, she resided in one of the most magnificent and beautiful palaces of Fatehpur Sikri which was built in the zenana complex. This palace was built as per Rajasthani architecture. This palace commonly known as Jodha Bai Mahal was also internally connected to the Khawabgah of Akbar. Her palace was decorated with paintings of Lord Krishna and in its time is reported to be studded with gems and frescoes. This palace also includes a temple used by the empress for her prayers and a Tulsi math. Jodha Bai's Mahal was a masterpiece with its commotion of Indian and Persian architecture. This was the biggest residential palace in the city, and to this day it stands, though in ruins, as a monument of Akbar's love for the Amber princess.

Her palace in Mandu called Nilkanth temple (Mandu) or as recorded by Jahangir in his biography, Imarat-i-Dilkhusha (the heart-pleasing abode), was the favourite retreat place of Jahangir where he would celebrate his birthdays with his mother as recorded by Thomas Roe, a Christian missionary in Jahangir's court. This palace was commissioned by Akbar for her in the year 1574 and has a Lord Shiva temple inside with a Shiv Ling and is built as per Mughal architecture on a hilltop. She was also the patron of several towns during her reign and held many jagirs like Bayana, pargana of Jansath, etc.

She would often travel to her hometown, Amber, which was just 200 km away from her home. The Empress also had the privilege to accompany Akbar often during his campaigns. During his Gujarat campaign when her brother Bhopat had fallen in the battle of Sarnal, Akbar sent Mariam-uz-Zamani, who was travelling with him during this campaign, to her native town Amer to pay condolences to her parents. She is recorded to be a virtuous woman with high ideals and fidelity. She had been faithful and highly devoted to her husband throughout her life having sided with Akbar than her son Salim, during the latter's rebellion against his father.

Jahangir's nature of the relationship with his mother
Jahangir paid obeisance to his mother by touching her feet. He records these instances with a sense of pride. His reference to his mother was preceded by the epithet 'Hazrat'. Jahangir referred to her as "Hazrat Mariam-uz-Zamani", "Her Majesty"  or at times "my exalted mother" out of his love for her in his memoirs.

In 1607 when Jahangir decides to visit Gardens of Babur, he decides to take his mother and a few ladies of his harem along with him and states, "I ordered Khurram to attend upon Hazrat Maryam-Zamani and the other ladies and to escort them to me. When they reached the neighbourhood of Lahore.. I embarked on a boat and went to a village named Dahr to meet my mother, and I had the good fortune to be received by her. After the performance of obeisance and prostration (rites of Korunish, Sajda, and Taslim before my exalted mother)..." Jahangir would greet his mother by performing Korunish, Sajda, and Taslim and after paying her homage used to pay respect to other elders and royals. The stature and reverence Jahangir held for his mother were exceptional, he used to carry her palanquin on his shoulders. During the plague of Agra when Jahangir was in Fatehpur Sikri, he says, "On January 1618, Mallika Mariam-uz-Zamani came from Agra to meet me and I attained the happiness of waiting on her. I hope that the shadow of her protection and affection will always be over the head of this supplicant."

The courtesies and largesse demonstrate by Jahangir surface the proof of the amount of respect and love he held for his mother, Mariam-uz-Zamani. In the words of Edward Terry, a foreign traveller to the Mughal court, "Jahangir's affection for his mother Her Majesty Mariam-uz-Zamani were exceptional, and not seldom would he show many expressions of duty and display his strong affections for her". She had hosted many events at her own palace, several royal functions and events took place in the household of Mariam-uz-Zamani like Jahangir's solar and lunar weighings, all his birthday celebrations, Jahangir's marriage to the Amer princess, daughter of Kunwar Jagat Singh,  Shahzada Parviz's wedding to the daughter of Sultan Murad Mirza and the henna ceremony of Ladli Begum, daughter of Nur Jahan and Shahryar Mirza.

Powers and Influence
The Empress held considerable freedom of speech in the political matters of court. She was one of the few wives of Akbar who had the privilege to attend and express her views on the matters of the court. One of the episodes recorded in the book of Badayuni notes that once on the execution of a Brahmin by a conservative Muslim courtier of Akbar while Akbar had ordered the investigation to be continued, the daughter of Raja Bharmal taunted Emperor Akbar publicly for failing to maintain the abidance of his order. She would exercise her influence to secure a pardon for offenders.

The religious ulemas of Akbar's court were utterly displeased by the influence of Mariam-uz-Zamani and his Hindu wives on him in making him follow the rituals and practices of Hindu culture. Since his marriage with the daughter of Raja Bharmal, he is said to have complimented her by ordering the continuous burning of the hom in which occasionally he would join her during her prayers.

Akbar taking note of the disapproval of Mariam-uz-Zamani and his other Hindu wives stopped eating beef as the cow was regarded as a sacred animal in their religion. His Hindu wives insisted that he must refrain from eating onions and garlic which Badayuni says he agreed to. They also exerted enough influence on him to never keep a beard and abstain from association with people who kept beards. In order to gain the love of his Hindu wives and their goodwill, Badayuni notes, he abstained entirely from everything which was a natural abhorrence to them and took it as a mark of special devotion to himself if men shaved their beards so that it became common practice.

The influence of Mariam-uz-Zamani and his Hindu wives was highly resented by the Muslim conservatives of the court, even more, when Akbar had ordered everyone in the court to stand up during the evening prayers of his Hindu wives when they would light up the hom in their temples to honour their traditions and culture and made sure that he was no exception to it.

Akbar's Imperial harem was re-organized into a fortress-like institution which is quite in contrast to the image of the reigns of Babur and Humayun. Harbans Mukhia attributed this change to the growing influence of Rajput cultural ethos on Akbar ever since his marriage in 1562 to Mariam-uz-Zamani. Ira Mukhoty draws a parallel between Akbar's reverence for sun worship and Harka Bai's family clan emblem being Lord Surya (sun).

One of her intercessions in the inclination of his son include in May 1603, when Akbar suggested that Salim should undertake a military expedition for chastizement of Rana Amar Singh who was making encroachments on Mughal territories in Rajasthan. Salim suspicious of his father's motives expressed his reluctance to accept the assignment however this provoked Akbar to issue a formal firman appointing Shahzada Salim to the command of the proposed expedition. The ladies of the harem, Mariam-uz-Zamani and Salima Sultan Begum requested the Emperor not to press the matter, and let Salim continue to live under his eye at the court. Akbar succumbed to their pleas and withdrew the firman. Muni Lal says that at the time when Akbar marched towards Salim to wage a war, Mariam-uz-Zamani was torn by conflicting loyalties between father and son.

Muni Lal notes another intervention of her alongside Salima Sultan Begum to revoke the orders of house arrest for Salim by Akbar. After the death of Hamida Bano Begum, in order to cease his rebellions and put an end to his alcoholism and debauchery, Akbar ordered he should be kept in solitary confinement in ghusalkhana and ordered no serving of alcohol and opium. Salim begging for wine the entire time behaved like a madman. Akbar appointed his physician to recommend the minimum necessary alcohol for his health. Muni Lal claims, 'the taming of the temperamental Salim bristled with complications, especially when Mariam Zamani and Salima Begum took into their scheming heads to leave no design unused to win freedom for their Baba'. The pressure from the senior queens became too compelling to be resisted for long. Akbar gave in and allowed Salim to shift to his palace.

The Empress of Hindustan was the wealthiest and most distinguished woman of her time. She was honoured by various members of the regality of prominent nations during her husband and son's reign by receiving several precious and exorbitant gifts. The Empress was the recipient of a noble gift, in the year 1601, from the Queen of England. Mariam-uz-Zamani had numerous agents, middlemen, and financial advisers, "mirroring in miniature the Emperor's own finance ministry". She had her own vakils to advise her and maintain her various properties.

She was the only woman of her time to hold a military rank and was one of the four senior-most figures in the Mughal court and the only woman to hold the highest military rank which was at par with the rank of the emperor itself, 12,000 cavalry units. She was known to receive a jewel from every nobleman "according to his estate" each year on the occasion of the New Year's festival, an honour bestowed upon no other Mughal Empress. Jahangir accompanied by his courtiers would on the eve of the new year present her with jewels and presents at her palace.

Mariam-uz-Zamani was the senior-most woman in the imperial harem and held a high rank since the reign of Akbar. She had the right to issue official documents and edicts in her name, called Farman (sovereign mandates). Issuing of such orders was confined to the highest ladies of the harem such as Hamida Banu Begum, Nur Jahan, Mumtaz Mahal and Jahanara Begum. Mariam-uz-Zamani used her wealth to build gardens, wells, mosques, and other developments around the countryside and was in charge of the Hajj department since Akbar's reign. Mariam-uz-Zamani's retirement after her husband's death along with the death of Jagat Gosain led to the decline of Rajput influence in the Mughal court.

Khusrau's affair

After the death of Akbar in the year 1605, she became the prime shield of Khusrau Mirza and as noted by a Christian missionary present in Mughal court, she secured a pardon for the prince along with Salima Sultan Begum, Shakr-un-Nissa Begum, and Emperor Jahangir's other sisters upon Jahangir's succession. Nur Jahan is noted to have faked tears in front of her mother-in-law, Queen Mother Mariam-uz-Zamani for the possession of the charge of Prince Khusrau who was considered a powerful contender to the throne by the ambitious empress Nur Jahan however, she did not succeed.

Ellison Banks Findly notes a strong-worded letter of Mariam-uz-Zamani to her son, Jahangir, written by her in the year 1616 expressing her concern for the safety of Khusrao Mirza and cites that she had anticipated that if Khusrau's charge was to be entrusted to Nur Jahan junta whom she believed was eager to eliminate Khusrau they would eventually kill Khusrau and it would be disastrous for the Mughal dynasty as the future descendants would use it as a specimen to murder their brothers for the possession of the royal throne. Succumbing to the pleas of his mother, sisters, Khusrau's stepmothers and sisters, Jahangir did not transfer the control of Khusrau to Nur Jahan or prince Khurram. Further, Findly adds that this foretelling of her substantiated soon afterwards in the Mughal Empire when Shah Jahan's kids, Aurangzeb and Dara Shikoh had a face-off for the royal throne eventually leading to the murder of Prince Dara Shikoh by his brother.

As an Entrepreneur
Mariam-uz-Zamani was greatly interested in trade and commerce and was the earliest recorded woman who consistently engaged in inland and overseas trade. During the reigns of Akbar and Jahangir, she built ships that carried pilgrims to and from the Islamic holy city Mecca, ran an extensive trade of silk and several spices to international borders, and oversaw the trade with Gulf countries and nations. In the words of Findly, she had, in the larger arena, helped chart the role of Mughal women in the newly expanding business of foreign trade. Akbar took significant note of Mariam-uz-Zamani's activities of interest and invested time and money in her trading endeavours and had long discussions with the empress about her business endeavours. She was the only wife of Akbar authorized for international trade.

She would often travel to various cities of her empire and seaports to manage her trade business. As early as about 1595, in a story recorded by the Portuguese traveller Benedict Goes, when Mariam-uz-Zamani was travelling from a certain place for her business exigency, she was robbed of all her personal possessions and was left without the ordinary necessities of life. Jesuit Benedict Goes hearing this assisted her before prince Salim could reach her. When this news was delivered to Akbar's court, Akbar and his court attendants in astonishment praised and thanked Benedict for his services to the queen as the assistance she sought from her countrymen was delivered to her by a stranger. Salim who was at a distance of eight days from his mother came in haste to meet his mother and meeting Benedict he embraced him and ordered full repayment of the advances he lent to the queen. When Mariam-uz-Zamani reached Akbar's court safely, several people arrived there to welcome her and presented her with many gifts.

Regarded as a woman who built the first large sea-faring ships of the Mughals at Lahore, she was the owner and patron of the largest ships named Rahīmī and afterward Ganj-i-Sawai. No other noblewoman on record seems to have been as adventurous a trader as the Queen Mariam-uz-Zamani, however, and no trader's ship (especially the Rahimi) seems to have gotten into as much trouble as hers. Nur Jahan and Jahanara Begum carried on the legacy of Mariam-uz-Zamani by engaging in overseas trade and commerce.

East India Company
In late 1610 or early 1611, when Mariam-uz-Zamani's ship was being loaded for Mocha, she sent one of her agents to buy indigo in Bayana (an important centre of indigo production 50 miles southwest of Agra) to be put aboard the ship for sale in Mocha. Just as the deal was being completed, however, William Finch, arrived and did what no Indian would dare to do. He offered a little more than she would have given, got the indigo, and made off with it. William Finch was an agent of Hawkins, ambassador of East India Company who was well received by Jahangir.

When Mariam-uz-Zamani heard that she had been outbid by an Englishman and had to suffer a great loss as the ship was set to sail, she was furious and complained to her son, the emperor, who made the English representative at the court, William Hawkins, suffer for a long time after that, mentioning that he had no choice but to curry favour with the jesuits in order to obtain a safe conduct that would allow him and his wife to travel to Goa, from where they would embark for Europe. William Finch, on the other hand, struggled to sell the acquired indigo in Lahore and had come to the conclusion that the prospects of English trade in India were hopeless. He informed Hawkins that he planned to sell the indigo in Aleppo, a Syrian city, and then travel back to England.

William Finch's hasty decision to outbid the charismatic Mariam-uz-Zamani had catastrophic consequences for the immediate future of the East India Company at Jahangir's court. The repercussions were so severe, in fact, that in 1612, English Captain Jourdain noted, " the Queen's ship, the Rahimi, was bound for Mocha, & the [local] merchants would not lade their goods aboard until wee [Europeans] were gone from the country."

Conflict with Portuguese
The Portuguese maintained relatively amicable relations during Akbar's reign, despite hostilities, and continued well until Jahangir's reign. During the reign of Jahangir, the Portuguese were threatened by the presence of other European traders, especially the English, in the Mughal Court. In order to pressurize the Emperor to expel European rivals from the Mughal court, the Portuguese challenged Jahangir's authority and prestige by targeting a ship owned by his mother, the Queen Mother Mariam-uz-Zamani.
 
William Hawkins noted that on February 1, 1609, he witnessed a great stirre touching the Mariam-uz-Zamani's ship as it prepared to carry goods to Mocha, an Arabian port south of Mecca at the Red Sea's entrance. The Portuguese threatened to abscond with the ship to Diu unless she paid an exorbitant fee for a cartaz or pass. It is recorded that the Portuguese demanded 1,00,000 mamudies for their cartaz and then 20,000; eventually, to forestall violence, the two sides were able to compromise on a much smaller payment of 1,000 rialls and some odd money.

One incident in particular that caused a rift between the Mughals and the Portuguese was the seizure and burning of Mariam-uz-Zamani's greatest pilgrimage ship, the Rahimi, in September 1613. Although she was carrying the necessary Portuguese pass, they and carried off Rahīmī with all of her richly laden cargo, worth 100,000 pounds, equivalent to today's currency, half a billion rupees, and the approximately 700 passengers still on board to Goa. Jahangir sent Muqarrab Khan, his governor, to lay siege to the Portuguese town of Daman. The Jesuit church in Agra, which had been built under Akbar, was closed, and all allowances to Portuguese priests in Mughal India were suspended. The entire Mughal court, as well as the city of Surat, is in an uproar, and the tumult and outcry at the Mughal court were unprecedented. The incident eventually led to a reduction of Portuguese influence:

Post Rahimi Business Activities
Mariam-uz-Zamani carried on with her commercial and pilgrimage ships despite losing her greatest pilgrimage ship, the Rahimi. She was in command of a fleet of ships. In 1617, two English pirates tried to seize Mariam-uz-Zamani's ship, which was returning from the Red Sea with numerous hajjis and valuable cargo, but in the nick of time, the ship was rescued. If it had not been for the fortunate interposition of the fleet of the East India Company, which came up before the contest was decided, the result of Englishmen's selfish enterprise would have been the closing of the busiest markets in India to English commerce.

After the loss of her ship Rahimi, the Dowager Empress then ordered the build of an even larger ship with 62 guns and the placement of over 400 musket men. It was named 'Ganj-I-Sawai' and in its day was the most fearsome ship in the sea with the objective of trade and taking pilgrims to Mecca and on the way back converting all the goods into gold, and silver, and bringing back the pilgrims.

Patron of Art and Architecture
Mariam-uz-Zamani was one of the great female patrons of the architecture of her time. She constructed one of the earliest built mosques in Lahore, Pakistan, as per Mughal architecture, known as the Begum Shahi Mosque. She sponsored a remarkable public work, a baoli (step-well) along with a garden near the old district at Brahambad, Bayana. However, only the baoli remains. She laid a large garden around the tomb of her deceased Emperor husband, Akbar and was also later buried there. She also commissioned the entrance to the Lahore fort, known as Masjidi Darwaza, now corrupted into Masti Darwaja (Masti Gate).

Both Mariam-uz-Zamani's mosque and baoli (step-well) had an inscription attesting to her role in the construction of these historical monuments. The mosque was constructed during the early period of Jahangir, in 1023 A.H./1614 A.D., as recorded in a Persian inscription fixed on the facade of the northern gate. A marble inscription on the gate of the baoli (step-well) dates it to the seventh year of Jahangir's reign (1612); it was thus built at the same time as Begum Shahi's mosque at Lahore. Thus Jahangir's reign bears the stamp of female patronage.

Begum Shahi Mosque

Begum Shahi Mosque is the earliest dated exquisite mosque of the Mughal Empire built during Jahangir's reign. This mosque was named after her in her honour and is known as the Begum Shahi Mosque. It is located close to the old Masti Gate of the Walled City of Lahore, opposite the eastern walls of the Lahore Fort. It stands out uniquely for its frescoes, which are significant for their perfect technique and variety of subjects. It featured the earliest dated Iranian motif in Mughal architecture.

This mosque stands as the best example of the fusion of Timurid and Safavid components. The prayer hall of Begum Shahi Mosque is a single-aisle five-bay structure with elaborate painted decoration. Its inner central dome reveals one of the first dated occurrences of a network developed from points arranged in concentric circles.

The mosque features Lahore's first five-bay prayer chamber that would later be typical of all later Mughal mosques such as the Wazir Khan Mosque and Badshahi Mosque. The ceilings of tomb Itimad-ud-Daula, with their richly polychromed net vaulting and stellate forms, are a more refined version of those at Begum Shahi Mosque. The spectacularly painted prayer chamber of Wazir Khan Mosque and its interior, as well as the central pishtaq's recessed arch and stellate vaulting, are richly polychromed using a technique similar to that on Begum Shahi Mosque.

At the time of its construction, this was the only important mosque located in the vicinity of the Lahore fort, and therefore it was frequented by the nobility of the Mughal court. The mosque remained frequented for prayer by the Mughal nobility and the common man alike for more than two hundred years until it was turned into a gunpowder factory by Ranjit Singh.

Mariam-uz-Zamani's Baoli

Around 1612 AD, she commissioned a great step well and a large garden in Bayana near district Brahmabad. The step well was much appreciated by her son, Jahangir, who visited it around 1619 and noted that it was a grand building and was very well built at an expense of just 20,000 rupees. The baoli was considered by the English traveller, Peter Mundy to be “the best of this Kinde that I have yet seene,... a very costly and curious piece of worke". Further he notes that it is a grand building with beautiful gates, cupolas, arches, chawtress, galleries, pillars and rooms above and below. The step-well consists of a gate, four flights of stairs leading down to the water level and a well-shaft at the farther end of the main axis, all constructed in red sandstone. Another European traveller, Thevenot who noticed this complex of garden and baoli notes it as a Royal house insinuating that this building was also meant to house the royal owner of this complex during her occasional visits to the locality.

The main gateway of the baoli is represented by a double-storeyed structure facing east where the smaller rectangular portal is framed into a high arch. This gateway appears to be typically representative of the post-Fatehpur Sikri Mughal architecture of the early 17th century, it also carries an imprint of Rajput conceptions. Although there are only two stories, it is constructed to give the three-storeyed effect from the front. The baoli was built as a part of the garden built by the empress. Rajeev Bargoti notes that her interest in indigo trade might have been because her revenue free grants were located in the indigo producing tract around Bayana including pargana Jansath.

Inscription on Mariam-uz-Zamani Baoli (step-well):

Death

Mariam-uz-Zamani died in May 1623, immensely rich and powerful, and due honour was given by burying her in a mausoleum close to that of an equally redoubtable man she was married to, Akbar. Her desire of being close to her husband even in death is visible in the proximity of her tomb to that of her husband, Akbar. There is no concrete evidence stating the reason for her death though it is believed to have been because of sickness. Jahangir had made several references in his autobiography towards her declining health since 1616 and calls her decrepit.

Her tomb, built between 1623 and 1627, is on Tantpur road in Jyoti Nagar, next to the tomb of Akbar. Mariam's Tomb, commissioned by her son, Jahangir, who grieved her loss immensely, is only a kilometre from Tomb of Akbar the Great, in the direction of Mathura and she stands as the only wife buried close to Akbar. Her tomb resembles her husband's mausoleum in one important aspect, the upper storey of both is open to the sun and rain, and its upper corners are embellished by beautiful pavilions surmounted by lovely domes. The grave itself is underground with a flight of steps leading to it.

Issue
Mughal Emperor Akbar and Mariam-uz-Zamani Begum are confirmed to have at least three children:
 Hassan Mirza (19 October 1564, Agra, Mughal Empire — 5 November 1564, Agra, Mughal Empire) (twin with Hussain)
 Hussain Mirza (19 October 1564, Agra, Mughal Empire — 29 October 1564, Agra, Mughal Empire) (twin with Hassan)
 Shahzada Salim (30 August 1569, Fatehpur Sikri, Mughal Empire — 28 October 1627, Rajouri, Mughal Empire)

She was also the foster mother of one of her stepsons:
 Daniyal Mirza (11 September 1572, Ajmer, Mughal Empire — 19 March 1605, Mughal Empire)

Notes

See also
Begum Shahi Mosque
Jodha Bai Mahal
Nilkanth temple (Mandu)
Rahīmī
Ganj-I-Sawai

In popular culture
Movies and T.V. serials
 Sulochana portrayed Rani Jodha Bai in the 1953 film Anarkali.
 Durga Khote portrayed Jodha Bai in the 1960 Indian epic film Mughal-e-Azam.
Jamuna played the role of Jodha bai in the Telugu movie Akbar Salim Anarkali
 Puja Acharya dawned the role of Mariam-uz-Zamani as 'Jodha Bai' in the Doordarshan television series Akbar The Great(1988-1989)
 Aishwarya Rai portrayed Jodha Bai in the 2008 film Jodhaa Akbar directed by Ashutosh Gowarikar.
 Paridhi Sharma played the role of Jodha Bai in the historical drama series Jodha Akbar which ran from 2013 to 2015.
 Delnaaz Irani portrayed Jodha Bai in the historical comedy series Har Mushkil Ka Hal Akbar Birbal from 2014 to 2016. She was replaced by Pragati Mehra in 2016 for a few episodes as she was unavailable due to personal issues.
 Tasha Kapoor portrayed the role of Heer Kunwari aka Jodha Bai in Bharat Ka Veer Putra - Maharana Pratap
 Jodha Bai was portrayed by Gurdeep Kohli in the Colors TV series Dastaan-E-Mohabbat Salim Anarkali.
 Aditi Sajwan portrayed the empress in the Star Bharat comedy series Akbar Ka Bal Birbal.
Anuradha Tarafdar played the role of Jodha Bai in Manohar Arshi's film, 'Akbar's Bridge'.
Sandhya Mridul portrayed Jodha Bai in Taj: Divided by Blood
Literature
 Jodha Bai is also a major character in Salman Rushdie's 2008 novel The Enchantress of Florence.
 She is the pivot character in the book of Subhadra Sen Gupta, The Teenage Diary of Jodh Bai, as the character Jodh bai.

Bibliography

References

External links
Jodha, More than Akbar's wife
Unknown fact about Queen Mother Mariam uz Zamani
Harking back: Mystery of the Rajput empress Mariam Zamani
Akbar and his favorite Rajput wife
Jodha, Queen of sheer opulence
Harking back: The Empress and her two doomed pilgrim ships

 
1542 births
1623 deaths
People from Jaipur district
Wives of Akbar
Rajput princesses
Mughal royal consorts
16th-century Indian women
16th-century Indian people
17th-century Indian women
16th-century businesspeople
17th-century Indian businesspeople
Queen mothers
Indian female royalty
Mughal nobility
Women of the Mughal Empire
Indian queen consorts
Mothers of Mughal emperors